In human anatomy, the internal thoracic artery (ITA), previously commonly known as the internal mammary artery (a name still common among surgeons), is an artery that supplies the anterior chest wall and the breasts. It is a paired artery, with one running along each side of the sternum, to continue after its bifurcation as the superior epigastric and musculophrenic arteries.

Structure
The internal thoracic artery arises from the anterior surface of the subclavian artery near its origin. It has a width of between 1-2 mm.

It travels downward on the inside of the rib cage, approximately 1 cm from the sides of the sternum, and thus medial to the nipple. It is accompanied by the internal thoracic vein.

It runs deep to the abdominal external oblique muscle, but superficial to the vagus nerve.

In adults, internal thoracic artery lies closest to the sternum at the first intercoastal space. The gap between the artery and lateral border of the sternum increases when going downwards, up to 1.1 cm to 1.3 cm at the sixth intercoastal space. In children, the gap ranges from 0.5 cm to 1.0 cm.

Branches
 Mediastinal branches
 Thymic branches
 Pericardiacophrenic artery - travels with the phrenic nerve
 Sternal branches
 Perforating branches
 Twelve anterior intercostal branches, two to each of the top six intercostal spaces. In a given space, the upper branch travels laterally along the bottom of the rib until it anastomoses with its corresponding posterior intercostal artery. The lower branch of the space anastomoses with a collateral branch of the posterior intercostal artery.

After passing the sixth intercostal space, the internal thoracic artery splits into the following two terminal branches:
 Musculophrenic artery - roughly follows the costal margin and it again gives branch for 7,8,9  ribs
 Superior epigastric artery - continues the course of the internal thoracic artery, travelling downward into the abdominal wall and to the content of recuts sheath

Function 
The internal thoracic artery supplies the chest wall and the breasts.

Clinical significance

Use in bypass grafts
The internal thoracic artery is the cardiac surgeon's blood vessel of choice for coronary artery bypass grafting. The left ITA has a superior long-term patency to saphenous vein grafts and other arterial grafts (e.g. radial artery, gastroepiploic artery) when grafted to the left anterior descending coronary artery, generally the most important vessel, clinically, to revascularize.

Plastic surgeons may use either the left or right internal thoracic arteries for autologous free flap reconstruction of the breast after mastectomy. Usually, a microvascular anastomosis is performed at the second intercostal space to the artery on which the free flap is based.

Additional images

References

External links

Figures of ITA grafts
 Figure of heart with two saphenous vein grafts (SVGs) and a LITA graft  - texheartsurgeons.com
 Drawing of the heart with a SVG to the right coronary artery (RCA) and a LITA graft to the LAD - darcystudios.com
 Drawing of the heart with a SVG to the RCA and a LITA graft to the LAD - mayoclinic.org

Arteries of the thorax